Ixodonerium is a genus of flowering plants in the family Apocynaceae, first described as a genus in  1933. It contains only one known species, Ixodonerium annamense, endemic to Vietnam.

References

Endemic flora of Vietnam
Monotypic Apocynaceae genera
Apocyneae